Momodou Lamin Jallow (born 27 May 1995), known professionally as J Hus, is a British rapper and singer who has been credited with pioneering the genre afroswing. He is currently signed to Black Butter Records. He gained popularity in 2015 following the release of his song "Dem Boy Paigon".

J Hus' "Did You See" became his most successful single, peaking at number nine on the UK Singles Chart and eventually being certified Platinum. In 2017, he released his debut album, Common Sense, which was critically acclaimed—it was named the best UK album of 2017 by Complex. The album reached number six on the UK Albums Chart. In June 2018, he was arrested in Stratford and charged with carrying a knife in public. Hours after his release from prison in April 2019, he made a surprise appearance on stage at Canadian rapper Drake's concert at the O2 Arena in London.

In January 2020, J Hus released his second album, Big Conspiracy, which featured appearances by Jamaican singer Koffee, Nigerian singer Burna Boy and British singer Ella Mai. The album became his first number-one on the UK Albums Chart and received widespread critical acclaim.

Early life
J Hus was born in London to Gambian parents and grew up in the city's Stratford district. He was raised by his mother, who emigrated to England when she was 25 years old. Jallow was raised Muslim and is of ethnic Fula and Wolof heritage. As a kid, he and his mother would go to African parties and his parents would play African Music for him. Growing up, he wanted to become an actor "but then around Year 10 or Year 11, it was whatever really", and he was expelled from school as he had, in his words, "started getting into a bit of trouble." In September 2014, distraught following two separate prison stints, he was advised to focus on pursuing a music career by his childhood friend Moe who also agreed to be his manager. Moe and his older brother would go on to form their own management company 2K Management.

J Hus got his stage name from the word "hustler", explaining that he would buy a pack of doughnuts and sell them individually at a profit when he was in secondary school.

Career

2015–present: Common Sense and Big Conspiracy 
J Hus began his career by recording several freestyles, including #StreetHeat, Bl@CKBOX and GRM Daily and publishing them online. He followed this with "#Rated", which samples the beat from French Montana's "Don't Panic", and "Want From Me" Remix of Kojo Funds' song, which gained a lot of coverage, helping his breakthrough. His next release was "Dem Boy Paigon", which was described by Ajay Rose of The Link Up as having "brought together an Afro-beat sound with lyrical rap ... capable of turning any dance upside down". He followed this with "No Lie" and his SB:TV "Warm Up Session".

Around the end of March 2015, he and MoStack released their "Westwood Crib Session". In late May 2015, he released "Lean & Bop", which was streamed more than 10 million times in total on music platforms. Around this time, he also released a "Daily Duppy" for GRM Daily, which he followed with his first mixtape, The 15th Day.

Jallow released the single "Friendly" in 2016, which received a nomination at the 2016 MOBO Awards, as well as "Playing Sports", "Liar Liar" (remix) and "Solo One", the last of which appeared on the Brotherhood soundtrack.

In 2017, he featured on Nines' "High Roller", which featured on his album One Foot Out. He also featured on Stormzy's "Bad Boys" from his album Gang Signs & Prayer, which peaked at number 22 on the UK Singles Chart, on Dave's "Samantha", which peaked at number 63, and charted at number 9 with his solo composition "Did You See". The song served as the lead single off his debut album, Common Sense (2017). Upon release, the album was positively received by fans, and includes features from Mo Stack, MIST, Tiggs da Author and Burna Boy. In May 2018, he released his EP, Big Spang (2018).

Following his arrest for carrying a bladed article in public, Jallow was sentenced to eight months in prison. Jallow's label stopped releasing music, with his only verse whilst incarcerated coming from the song "Disaster" which was released on collaborator Dave's debut album, Psychodrama. "Disaster" debuted at number eight on the UK Singles Chart on 15 March 2019.

Hours after his release from prison in April 2019 he made a surprise appearance on stage at Drake's concert at the O2 Arena in London.

In December 2019, J Hus announced he will no longer tour for "the next 3/4 years, maybe more". He also stated that following his next album, he would have no more features but that he wanted to work with Burna Boy and 21 Savage.

Personal life
J Hus is a supporter of Arsenal F.C.

Legal issues 
In 2011, J Hus was arrested outside Westfield following a "mass attack" on four people, which ended in one of them being stabbed. He'd already received a referral order that year after being caught with a knife in public.

In 2014 and 2015, he was arrested and served stints in Her Majesty's Feltham Prison. He accrued six convictions for ten offences between 2011 and 2016, including for carrying a knife and for violent disorder. He has also been given an ASBO.

In September 2015 the musician was admitted to hospital after being stabbed five times in London. Whilst in hospital, he was criticised for posting on Instagram a photo of him making a gang sign from his hospital bed with the message "5 stab wounds could never stop me #AntiCh #F***DaOvaSide". The attack left him with mild PTSD, for which at the time of his 2018 imprisonment he was seeing a therapist.

In June 2018, he was arrested in Stratford and charged with carrying a knife in public. He was subsequently dropped from the performance line-ups of the TRNSMT and Wireless festivals. Jallow appeared at Thames Magistrates' Court on 22 June and was released on bail. On 20 July, he pleaded not guilty, but changed his plea in October and in December was sentenced to eight months in jail. When asked why he had been carrying a six-inch blade, J Hus said: "You know, it's Westfield."

He was eventually released on 5 April 2019 and was welcomed back by Drake, joining him on stage at the 02 Arena during Drake's UK Assassination Vacation Tour.

Discography

Studio albums

Extended plays

Mixtapes

Singles

As a featured artist

Other charted songs

Guest appearances

Awards and nominations

References 

1995 births
Black Butter Records artists
Living people
English people of Gambian descent
Fula people
Rappers from London
People from Stratford, London
English male rappers
Gangsta rappers
Black British male rappers
Brit Award winners